IISR may refer to:
            
 Integrated, Intra-Squad Radio
 Indian Institute of Science and Religion
 International Indian School, Riyadh
 Indian Institute of Spices Research